The 2002 Bromont municipal election took place on November 3, 2002, to elect a mayor and councillors in Bromont, Quebec. Incumbent mayor Pauline Quinlan was re-elected to a second mandate without difficulty.

Results

Patrick Charbonneau is the son of former Cowansville mayor Jacques Charbonneau and the brother of Canadian Football League player Steve Charbonneau. Both Charbonneau and Brossard focused their campaigns on environmental concerns. In 2005, Charbonneau took part in a press conference to announce that Bromont's equestrian site from the 1976 Summer Olympics would be devoted to a permanent horse track. He did not seek re-election in 2005.

Source: Maurice Crossfield, "Quinlan re-elected Bromont mayor by landslide," Sherbrooke Record, 4 November 2002, p. 10.

References

Bromont municipal election